Yo no pedí vivir, is a Mexican telenovela produced by Irene Sabido for Televisa in 1977. Starring by Mapita Cortés, María Rivas and Elizabeth Dupeyrón.

Cast 
 Mapita Cortés as Gabriela Morando
 María Rivas as Soledad Nájera
 Antonio Medellín as César
 Elizabeth Dupeyrón as Irene
 Mario Casillas as Esteban
 Eric del Castillo as Pedro
 Carlos Fernández as Germán
 Yolanda Ciani as Lucía
 Mercedes Pascual as Sara
 Fernando Larrañaga as Mauricio
 María Fernanda as Martha Zárate
 Lourdes Canale as Josefa
 Odila Flores as Viviana
 Carlos Rotzinger as Francisco
 Miguel Gómez Checa as Fabio
 Martha Patricia as Michelle
 Josefina Echánove as Rosa
 Jorge Mondragón
 Alberto Inzúa
 Alfonso Meza

References

External links 

Mexican telenovelas
Televisa telenovelas
Spanish-language telenovelas
1977 telenovelas
1977 Mexican television series debuts
1977 Mexican television series endings